Curtis Jackson or 50 Cent (born 1975), is an American rapper.

Curtis Jackson may also refer to:
 Curtis Jackson (gridiron football) (born 1973), American football wide receiver
 Curtis Jackson (cricketer) (born 1967), Bermudian cricketer
 Curtis "C.J." Jackson, fictional character from the American television series, The White Shadow
 Curtis Jackson, character in American Ninja